Henglan is a town situated at the eastern periphery of the city of Zhongshan, Guangdong province. The population of Henglan has 103,135 residents. The total area of the town is .its geographical coordinates are 22° 31' 34" North, 113° 15' 37" East and its original name (with diacritics) is Henglan.

See also
Shatian dialect

External links
Henglan Government Website

Zhongshan
Township-level divisions of Guangdong